William Norton Shinn (October 24, 1782, Burlington County, New Jersey – August 18, 1871, Mount Holly Township, New Jersey) was a United States representative from New Jersey.

Biography
Shinn was a farmer and Sheriff of Burlington County, New Jersey from 1825 to 1828.  He was elected to the New Jersey General Assembly in 1828, served in the New Jersey Legislative Council in 1818 and 1829 to 1832, and was chairman of the New Jersey Democratic State Committee in 1832.

Shinn was elected as a Jacksonian to the Twenty-third and Twenty-fourth Congresses, serving in office from March 4, 1833 – March 3, 1837.

After retiring from Congress, he resumed farming, and served as president of the Burlington Agricultural Association in 1853 and 1854.  He also was elected a director of The Camden & Amboy Railroad.

Shinn died in Mount Holly, New Jersey on August 18, 1871, and was buried in Mount Holly Cemetery.

External links

1782 births
1871 deaths
New Jersey sheriffs
Democratic Party members of the New Jersey General Assembly
Members of the New Jersey Legislative Council
Politicians from Burlington County, New Jersey
Jacksonian members of the United States House of Representatives from New Jersey
19th-century American politicians